Messapus (Ancient Greek: Μέσσαπος Messapos) was the ninth king of Sicyon in the Peloponnesus according to classical Greek mythography.

Mythology 
Writers quoting Castor of Rhodes stated that he reigned over Sicyon for 47 years following Leucippus, and before Eratus. However, Pausanius omitted this king Messapus, alleging that the throne passed directly from Leucippus, who had no male heir, to his grandson Peratus.

According to Strabo, Messapio in Boeotia and later Messapia in southeastern Italy, derived their names from this Messapus.

Notes

References 

 Pausanias, Description of Greece with an English Translation by W.H.S. Jones, Litt.D., and H.A. Ormerod, M.A., in 4 Volumes. Cambridge, MA, Harvard University Press; London, William Heinemann Ltd. 1918. . Online version at the Perseus Digital Library
 Pausanias, Graeciae Descriptio. 3 vols. Leipzig, Teubner. 1903.  Greek text available at the Perseus Digital Library.
Strabo, The Geography of Strabo. Edition by H.L. Jones. Cambridge, Mass.: Harvard University Press; London: William Heinemann, Ltd. 1924. Online version at the Perseus Digital Library.
Strabo, Geographica edited by A. Meineke. Leipzig: Teubner. 1877. Greek text available at the Perseus Digital Library.

Mythological kings of Sicyon
Kings in Greek mythology
Sicyonian characters in Greek mythology